Edward Matthew Wellington (20 November 1921 – 7 June 2004) was an Australian rules footballer who played with North Melbourne in the Victorian Football League (VFL).

Notes

External links 

1921 births
Australian rules footballers from Victoria (Australia)
North Melbourne Football Club players
2004 deaths